Mirza Azeem Baig Chughtai (December 30, 1928 – February 17, 2009), known in literary circles by his takhallus (pen name) Shabnam Romani, was a renowned Urdu poet based in Karachi, Pakistan. Shabnam Romani wrote a number of books including Jazeera, Doosra Himala, and Tohmat. Romani was born in Budaun, India, but moved to Pakistan and lived most of his life in Karachi.  He was the publisher and editor of Quarterly Aqdar, a literary Urdu magazine. He wrote a regular column in "Daily Mashriq" Karachi.

At the age of 80, Romani died on February 17, 2009, after a long illness.
Faisal Azeem, one of Romani's two sons, is a poet based in Canada—his book "Meri AankhoN saay Dekho" was published in 2006.

Shabnam's works
 Masnavi Sair-e-Karachi (1959)
 Jazeera
 Tohmat
 Doosra Himala
 Hyde Park
 Mozay Chilghozay
 Hurf Nissbat . hajira

References
http://www.dawn.com/2003/10/19/local9.htm
https://web.archive.org/web/20071114062053/http://www.urdudost.com/albums/album01.html

External links
Official Website

1928 births
2009 deaths
Urdu-language poets from Pakistan
Pakistani poets
Muhajir people
Pakistani scholars
Writers from Karachi
Pakistani magazine editors
Magazine publishers (people)
Pakistani publishers (people)
20th-century poets